TAPCO (The American Parts Company) is a mail order company which began as a family business over 25 years ago outside of Atlanta in Kennesaw, GA, dealing in tactical firearm accessories . In 2005, TAPCO re-branded to focus on U.S. manufacturing as a manufacturer and wholesaler. TAPCO sells to many direct dealers and distributors only. Their distributors include RSR Group, Ellett Brothers, Cope's Distributing, Mississippi Auto Arms, DPH Arms, and others. Many gun manufacturers including Red Jacket Firearms, Krebs Custom, Tromix, Century International Arms, and Mach 1 Arsenal use TAPCO parts in their custom firearms.

References

Mail-order retailers
Companies based in Atlanta